Nicholas Ashton (8 October 1904 – 17 July 1986) was an English cricketer. He played one first-class match for Oxford University Cricket Club in 1924. He was educated at Repton School and Oriel College, Oxford. He married 6 October 1928 in Paris Carmen Antoinette Dotézac; the religious ceremony took place in the church of la Madeleine in Paris. They had two daughters. During World War II he was a pilot officer in the Royal Air Force.

See also
 List of Oxford University Cricket Club players

References

External links
 

1904 births
1986 deaths
Alumni of Oriel College, Oxford
Cricketers from Nottinghamshire
English cricketers
Oxford University cricketers
People educated at Repton School
Royal Air Force officers
Royal Air Force personnel of World War II